A derivative of the name Gustav, Gustafson, Gustafsson, Gustavson, or Gustavsson, is a group of fairly common surnames of Scandinavian origin, and may refer to any of the following people:

Gustafson 
Andy Gustafson, American collegiate football coach
Axel Carl Johan Gustafson, Swedish author
Ben E. Gustafson, American politician
Barry Gustafson, New Zealand political scientist and historian
Bob Gustafson, American cartoonist
Cliff Gustafson, American baseball coach
Derek Gustafson, American pro hockey goalie
Dwight Gustafson (1930–2014), American composer and conductor
Earl B. Gustafson, American politician, judge, and lawyer
Fredrik Gustafson, Swedish football player
Gabriel Gustafson, Swedish archaeologist
Gerald Gustafson, U.S. Air Force pilot
James Gustafson, American theological ethicist
James Gustafson (politician), American politician
John Gustafson, English rock bassist
John L. Gustafson (born 1955), American computer scientist
Kathryn Gustafson, American architect
Leonard Gustafson, Canadian Senator
Megan Gustafson (born 1996), American basketball player
Nancy Gustafson, American opera singer
Ralph Barker Gustafson, Canadian poet
Ruth Gustafson (1881–1960), Swedish social democrat
Sophie Gustafson, Swedish professional golfer
Stan Gustafson, American politician
Steve Gustafson, bass guitarist, member of 10,000 Maniacs
Thane Gustafson, American author and political scientist
Tomas Gustafson, aka Sven Thomas Gustafson, Swedish speed-skater
Wallace Gustafson (1925–2018), American lawyer and politician 
Wylie Gustafson, American country music artist

Gustafsson 

Alexander Gustafsson (born 1987), Swedish mixed martial arts fighter
Andreas Gustafsson (born 1981), Swedish race walker
Anton Gustafsson, Swedish professional ice hockey player
August Gustafsson (born 1993), Thai footballer
Billy Gustafsson, Swedish politician and member of Riksdag
Bo Gustafsson, Swedish Olympian
Bengt Gustafsson (astronomer) (born 1943), Swedish astronomer
Bengt Gustafsson (general), Supreme Commander of the Swedish Armed Forces
Bengt-Åke Gustafsson, Swedish hockey player and coach
Count Axel Gustafsson Oxenstierna, historical Swedish statesman
Dennis Gustafsson, professional bandy player
Eddie Gustafsson, Swedish football player
Einar Gustafsson, Swedish farmer and politician
Elina Gustafsson, Finnish boxer
Elin Gustafsson, Swedish politician
Erik Gustafsson (musician), bass guitarist, formerly of Therion
Erik Gustafsson (ice hockey b. 1988), Swedish ice hockey player
Erik Gustafsson (ice hockey b. 1992), Swedish ice hockey player 
Hans Gustafsson (1923–1998), Swedish politician
Jan Gustafsson, German chess grandmaster
Jan-Eric Gustafsson (born 1949), Swedish educational psychologist
Lars Gustafsson, Swedish poet
Lars-Eric Gustafsson (born 1935), Swedish rower 
Magnus Gustafsson, former Swedish professional tennis player
Mats Gustafsson, Swedish saxophonist 
Nils Gustafsson, acquitted Finnish murder suspect
Olof Gustafsson, entrepreneur
Per Gustafsson, professional Swedish hockey player
Peter Gustafsson, Swedish golfer
Robert Gustafsson, Swedish comedian
Roger Gustafsson, Swedish football player 
Simon Gustafsson, Swedish speedway rider
Sofia Gustafsson (born 1990), Swedish curler
Toini Gustafsson, Swedish skier
Tore Gustafsson, Swedish hammer thrower
Veikka Gustafsson, Finnish mountaineer
Åke Gustafsson, Swedish scientist and poet
Tomas Antonelius, né Gustafsson, former Swedish football player (footballer)
Ulf Gustafsson (born 1937), Swedish rower
Greta Garbo, née Gustafsson, legendary Swedish actress

Gustavson 

Don Gustavson, American politician and member of the Nevada Senate
Erik Gustavson, Norwegian film director and producer
Eva Gustavson, aka Eva Gustafson, a Norwegian-American contralto singer 
John Gustavson, Swedish politician 
Linda Gustavson, American swimmer and Olympic champion
Mark Gustavson, American composer of contemporary classical music
Paul Gustavson, American comic-book writer and artist
Penry Gustavson, American politician

Gustavsson 
Arvid Gustavsson, Lord of Vik, medieval Swedish justiciar
Eva-Lena Gustavsson (born 1956), Swedish politician
Filip Gustavsson (born 1998), Swedish ice hockey player
Frida Gustavsson (born 1993), Swedish model
Gustav Gustavsson, 17th-century count 
Jonas Gustavsson (born 1984), Swedish ice hockey goaltender
Karl Nicklas Gustavsson, Swedish composer
Martin Gustavsson (born 1980), Swedish swimmer
Patrik Gustavsson (born 2001), Thai footballer
Paul Gustavson (1916–1977), Finnish-American comic book writer

See also
Gustav IV Adolf, king of Sweden who after his deposition travelled incognito under the name Colonel Gustafsson.
Gustafson's law, a law of computer engineering 
Gustafsen Lake Standoff, an indigenous land dispute from 1995 in Canada 
 A type of disease known as X-linked mental retardation type Gustavson
Peter B. Gustavson School of Business
Gustav (disambiguation)
Gustavsen
Fargo (film)

Swedish-language surnames
Patronymic surnames